2-MDP (U-23807A) is a dissociative anaesthetic drug which has been found to be an NMDA antagonist and produces similar effects to PCP in animals. The levo or (-) isomer is the active form of the drug. It also has stimulant effects, having only around one third the potency of amphetamine by weight, but with a long duration of action, lasting more than 24 hours from a single oral dose.

Effects
The therapeutic action is said to exhibit appetite suppressant and antidepressant like activity.

Synthesis

In a variation of the nitrile-Aldol reaction (also demonstrated for venlafaxine), combination of benzophenone (1) and propionitrile (2), in the presence of sodamide base and ethyl ether solvent, leads to 3-hydroxy-2-methyl-3,3-diphenylpropanenitrile [6275-86-1] (3). The reduction of the intermediate nitrile group with lithium aluminium hydride completed the synthesis of U-23,807A (4).

References 

Dissociative drugs
Stimulants